Positive Thinking... is the tenth and final album recorded by Acoustic Alchemy for GRP in 1998.

It marks a milestone in the band's history not only for the change of record company, but for the loss of founding member Nick Webb, who died during the recording of this album. His name appears in the credits for having contributed to every song, however Webb's parts in the recordings were done by longstanding sideman John Parsons.

Current steel string guitarist Miles Gilderdale contributes to two songs on this album.

The song "Augustrasse 18" is titled after the address of the Hansahaus-Studios in Bonn, Germany (actually written Auguststraße) where Acoustic Alchemy recorded numerous albums under producer John Parsons.

Track listing

Personnel 

Greg Carmichael - Steel and Nylon String Guitar
John Parsons - Electric and Steel Guitar
Miles Gilderdale - Electric Guitar and Programing
Dennis Murphy - Bass Guitar
John Sheppard - Drums
Nick Webb - Composition, Arrangements, and Inspiration
Rainer Brüninghaus - Keyboards
Mario Argandoña -Percussion
Caroline Dale - Cello and other String Instruments

References

1998 albums
Acoustic Alchemy albums
GRP Records albums